Herbert Hobein (born 25 December 1906, date of death unknown) was a German field hockey player who competed in the 1928 Summer Olympics.

He was a member of the German field hockey team, which won the bronze medal. He played three matches as forward and scored two goals.

External links
 
Herbert Hobein's profile at databaseOlympics.com

1906 births
Year of death missing
Field hockey players at the 1928 Summer Olympics
German male field hockey players
Olympic bronze medalists for Germany
Olympic field hockey players of Germany
Olympic medalists in field hockey
Medalists at the 1928 Summer Olympics